Eucalyptus major, commonly known as grey gum, is a species of tree that is endemic to a small area near the New South Wales - Queensland border. It has smooth greyish bark, lance-shaped adult leaves, flower buds in groups of seven and conical to cup-shaped fruit.

Description
It has smooth, blotched greyish bark that is shed in large plates or flakes. Flowering has been recorded in November and the flowers are white.

Taxonomy and naming
This eucalypt was first formally described in 1923 by Joseph Maiden who gave it the name Eucalyptus propinqua var. major and published the description in his book A Critical Revision of the Genus Eucalyptus. In 1934, William Blakely raised the variety to species status as Eucalyptus major, publishing the change in his book A Key to the Eucalypts. The specific epithet (major) is a Latin word meaning "greater".

Distribution and habitat
The grey gum grows in tall forest in coastal areas and nearby hills in south-eastern Queensland, south from the Blackdown Tableland to far northern New South Wales.

Conservation status
This eucalypt is classified as "least concern" in Queensland under the Queensland Government Nature Conservation Act 1992.

References

major
Myrtales of Australia
Flora of New South Wales
Trees of Australia
Taxa named by Joseph Maiden
Taxa named by William Blakely
Plants described in 1923